Public Bank Vietnam Limited (PBVN) (Vietnamese: Ngân hàng TNHH MTV Public Việt Nam) is a bank based in Hanoi, Vietnam, offering financial services in Vietnam. It was transformed from VID Public Bank (VIDPB) - a joint venture between Bank for Investment and Development of Vietnam (BIDV) of Vietnam and Public Bank Berhad (PBB) of Malaysia with equal stake established in May 1992. The transformation completed on March 24th, 2016 and the bank officially commenced operations on April 1st, 2016.

Background 
VIDPB was one of the first joint-venture banks in Vietnam when it was established in May 1992. On July 15th, 2014, PBB acquired all BIDV's stake in the joint-venture. On March 24th, 2015, State Bank of Vietnam (SBV) approved in principle that allow VIDPB to transform into a wholly owned subsidiary of PBB. After meeting all SBV's requirements, the bank was officially allowed to transform to Public Bank Vietnam Limited on March 24th, 2016.

After the transformation, it became the 6th bank with 100% foreign ownership in Vietnam (after HSBC Vietnam Limited, ANZ Vietnam Limited, Standard Chartered Bank Vietnam Limited, Shinhan Bank Vietnam Limited and Hong Leong Bank Vietnam Limited). Its current charter capital is of VND6 trillion.

Operations 
PBVN currently has a network of 17 branches, i.e. in Hanoi (5), Haiphong (1), Da Nang (2), Bình Dương (1), Đồng Nai (1) and Ho Chi Minh City (7). Besides, it also has 9 transaction bureaus, i.e. in Hanoi (2) and Ho Chi Minh City (7).

Currently, the bank serves millions of customers in 6 cities / provinces where it operates.

Main competitors 
 Joint Stock Commercial Bank for Foreign Trade of Vietnam (Vietcombank)
 Bank for Investment and Development of Vietnam (BIDV)
 Vietinbank
 Vietnam Bank for Agriculture and Rural Development (Agribank)

See also 
 List of banks in Vietnam

External links 
 Official website

Banks of Vietnam
Banks established in 1992
Companies based in Hanoi
1992 establishments in Vietnam